Worrell is a mainly English surname of:

People
 Bernie Worrell (1944–2016), American keyboardist and composer
 Cameron Worrell (born 1979), American football player
 David Worrell (born 1978), Irish football player
 Eric Worrell (1924–1987), Australian herpetologist
 Ernest P. Worrell, fictional character by Jim Varney
 Frank Worrell (1924–1967), West Indies cricketer and Jamaican senator after whom the Frank Worrell Trophy is named
Lola Carrier Worrell (1870-1929) composer and doll designer
 Mark Worrell (born 1983), American baseball player
 Peter Worrell (born 1977), Canadian ice hockey player
 Tim Worrell (born 1967), American baseball player
 Todd Worrell (born 1959), American baseball player
 Trix Worrell (born 1960), English writer and director
 Worrell Sterling (born 1965), English football player

Others
 Worrell 1000, a 1,000-mile beach catamaran race between South Beach, Florida, and Virginia Beach, Virginia

See also 
 
 Worrall (disambiguation)

English-language surnames